Đurinac may refer to:

 Đurinac (Svrljig), a village in Serbia
 Đurinac (Svilajnac), a village in Serbia